Chan Chen is a village located in Corozal District, Belize. Most of the inhabitants speak Spanish or Yucatec Maya, along with some English. The name Chan Chen is Yucatec maya meaning "small well" in English. Most Chan Chen inhabitants are of Maya ancestry.

References

Populated places in Corozal District